Milind is an Indian given name. Notable people with this name include:

Milind Chittal, Indian classical vocalist
Milind Date (born 28 February) is an Indian flautist and music composer who plays the Bansuri
Milind Deora (born 1976), Indian politician, former Union Minister of State (MoS) for Communications & Information Technology and Shipping
Milind Ekbote, president of Dharmaveer Sambhaji Maharaj Pratishthan and Samasta Hindu Aghadi
Milind Gadhavi (born 1985), Gujarati language poet and lyricist from Gujarat, India
Milind Gawali (born 1966), Indian actor and director
Milind Gunaji (born 1961), Indian actor, model, television presenter, writer and author
Milind Gunjal (born 1959), Indian former first-class cricketer
Milind Ingle, Indian singer and music director from Pen, Maharashtra
Milind Anna Kamble, Indian politician and member of the Nationalist Congress Party
Milind Kamble, Indian entrepreneur notable for establishing Dalit Indian Chamber of Commerce and Industry (DICCI)
Milind Vasant Kirtane, Indian otorhinolaryngologist, reported to have performed the first cochlear implant surgery in Mumbai
Milind Kumar (born 1991), Indian professional cricketer
Milind Mane (born 1970), member of the 13th Maharashtra Legislative Assembly
Chama Milind (born 1994), Indian first-class cricketer plays for Hyderabad cricket team
Milind Mulick, Indian watercolour painter, teacher and author
Milind Naik (politician), Indian Politician from the state of Goa
Milind Rege (born 1949), former Indian first-class cricketer
Milind Shinde, Indian actor and film director who works in Marathi, Kannada and Hindi films
Milind Soman (born 1965), Indian actor, supermodel, film producer, and fitness enthusiast
Milind Tambe, Gordon McKay Professor of Computer Science and Director of Center for Research on Computation and Society at Harvard University
Milind Teltumbde (died 2021), alias Jeeva or Deepak, Maoist insurgent leader and Central Committee member of CPI (Maoist)
Milind Vaidya (Marathi: मिलिंद वैद्य) is Shiv Sena Politician from Mumbai

See also
Anand–Milind, duo of Indian film music composers
Milind College, group of three coeducational general degree colleges located in Aurangabad, Maharashtra, India
Millinder